Titsey Woods is a  biological Site of Special Scientific Interest north-west of Oxted in Surrey.

This site is composed of wet semi-natural woods on Gault Clay with diverse ground flora. There are a number of uncommon Lepidoptera, including the silver-washed fritillary and white-letter hairstreak butterflies and rose-marbled and alder kitten moths.

References

Sites of Special Scientific Interest in Surrey